Garra ghorensis, the Jordanian log sucker or Dead Sea garra, is a species of ray-finned fish in the family Cyprinidae.
It is native to Israel and Jordan, although it is no longer found in Israel. Its natural habitat is freshwater springs. It is threatened by habitat loss.

References

Garra
Fish described in 1982
Taxonomy articles created by Polbot